Artemis is a protein that in humans is encoded by the DCLRE1C (DNA cross-link repair 1C) gene.

Function 

Artemis is a nuclear protein that is involved in V(D)J recombination and DNA repair. The protein has endonuclease activity on 5' and 3' overhangs and hairpins when complexed with PRKDC.

Immune response 

Artemis plays an essential role in V(D)J recombination, the process by which B cell antibody genes and T cell receptor genes are assembled from individual V (variable), D (diversity), and J (joining) segments.  For example, in joining a V segment to a D segment, the RAG (recombination activating gene) nuclease cuts both DNA strands adjacent to a V segment and adjacent to a D segment.  The intervening DNA between the V and D segments is ligated to form a circular DNA molecule that is lost from the chromosome.  At each of the two remaining ends, called the coding ends, the two strands of DNA are joined to form a hairpin structure.  Artemis nuclease, in a complex with the DNA-dependent protein kinase (DNA‑PK), binds to these DNA ends and makes a single cut near the tip of the hairpin.  The exposed 3' termini are subject to deletion and addition of nucleotides by a variety of exonucleases and DNA polymerases, before the V and D segments are ligated to restore the integrity of the chromosome.  The exact site of cleavage of the hairpin by Artemis is variable, and this variability, combined with random nucleotide deletion and addition, confers extreme diversity upon  the resulting antibody and T-cell receptor genes, thus allowing the immune system to mount an immune response to virtually any foreign antigen.  In Artemis-deficient individuals, V(D)J recombination is blocked because the hairpin ends cannot be opened, and so no mature B or T cells are produced, a condition known as severe combined immune deficiency (SCID).  Artemis was first identified as the gene defective in a subset of SCID patients that were unusually sensitive to radiation.

Repair of DNA breaks 

Cells deficient in Artemis are more sensitive than normal cells to X‑rays and to chemical agents that induce double-strand breaks (DSBs), and they show a higher incidence of chromosome breaks following irradiation.  Direct measurement of DSBs by pulsed-field electrophoresis indicates that in Artemis-deficient cells 75-90% of DSBs are repaired rapidly, just as in normal cells.  However, the remaining 10-20% of DSBs that are repaired more slowly (2-24 hr) in normal cells, are not repaired at all in Artemis-deficient cells.  Repair of these presumably difficult-to-rejoin breaks also requires several other proteins, including the Mre11/Rad50/NBS1 complex, the ataxia telangiectasia mutated ATM kinase, and 53BP1.  Because Artemis can remove damaged ends from DNA, it has been proposed that these DSBs are those whose damaged ends require trimming by Artemis.  However, evidence that both ATM and Artemis are specifically required for repair of DSBs in heterochromatin, has called this interpretation into question.

Artemis functions in the repair of DNA double-strand breaks that arise by induced oxidative reactions, or by endogenous reactions.  Such DNA repair occurs in heterochromatin as well as in euchromatin.

Clinical significance 

Mutations in this gene cause Athabascan-type severe combined immunodeficiency (SCIDA).

Interactions 

DCLRE1C has been shown to interact with DNA-PKcs.

References

Further reading

External links